Brandon Rayshun Reed (born April 10, 1981) is a former American football defensive back who played one season with the San Francisco 49ers of the National Football League. He played college football at Troy University and attended Russell County High School in Seale, Alabama. He was also a member of the Hamburg Sea Devils, New York Jets, Orlando Predators and Tampa Bay Storm.

Professional career

San Francisco 49ers
Reed was signed by the San Francisco 49ers on April 30, 2004 after going undrafted in the 2004 NFL Draft. He was released by the 49ers on September 3, 2005.

Hamburg Sea Devils
Reed was drafted by the Hamburg Sea Devils of NFL Europe in January 2006. He was named to the All-NFL Europe League team.

New York Jets
Reed signed with the New York Jets on May 30, 2006. He was released by the Jets on August 27, 2006.

Orlando Predators
Reed was signed by the Orlando Predators on December 18, 2006. He was released by the Predators on February 23, 2008.

Tampa Bay Storm
Reed signed with the Tampa Bay Storm on March 4, 2008.

Coaching career

Columbus Lions
Reed has been defensive backs coach for the Columbus Lions since 2010.

Personal life
Reed owns Big Play Sports Fitness in Phenix City, Alabama. It is geared towards helping children athletically.

References

External links
Just Sports Stats
NFL Draft Scout

Living people
1981 births
Players of American football from Columbus, Georgia
American football defensive backs
African-American players of American football
Troy Trojans football players
San Francisco 49ers players
Hamburg Sea Devils players
Orlando Predators players
Tampa Bay Storm players
21st-century American businesspeople
African-American businesspeople
Businesspeople from Georgia (U.S. state)
21st-century African-American sportspeople
20th-century African-American people